Bogesund Castle is a  former manor in  municipality of Vaxholm, about  to the east of Stockholm, Sweden. It is located in the  center of the  Bogesundslandet nature reserve (Bogesundslandets naturreservat).
The castle style building  overlooks the main shipping channel into and out of Stockholm through the Stockholm archipelago.

History
The building was built in the 1640s on the initiative of Per Brahe the Younger (1602–1680) and was later rebuilt several times.
The house received its current appearance with towers and gothic windows in the 1860s according to drawings by the architects Fredrik Wilhelm Scholander 
(1816–1881) and Thor Medelplan  (1832-1863).

See also
List of castles in Sweden

References

External links
 

Castles in Stockholm County
 Manor houses in Sweden